Sankinani Vishnuvardhan (born 30 October 1976) is an Indian former cricketer. He played 32 first-class matches for Hyderabad between 1995 and 2005.

See also
 List of Hyderabad cricketers

References

External links
 

1976 births
Living people
Indian cricketers
Hyderabad cricketers
People from Warangal